Rhumbline may refer to:

 Rhumb line (or loxodrome), an arc crossing all meridians of longitude at the same angle
 A rhumbline network (group of windroses), or straight lines, sometimes emerging from a compass rose, used in portolan charts and in some planispheres